Muhammad Mardi Mirza bin Abdullah, formerly known as Mardi Anak Bujang (born 19 October 1984) is a Bruneian footballer who last played for Kasuka FC.

Mardi spent most of his footballing career at QAF FC, with a brief spell on loan at DPMM FC in 2008. He moved to Jerudong FC after QAF FC waived entry to the 2015 Brunei Super League. At the start of the 2016 season, he moved to newly promoted Kasuka FC.

International career

Mardi first played for Brunei on 2 April 2006 against Sri Lanka in a 0–1 defeat. He scored his first goal for the national team in a 2–3 win against Timor-Leste on 12 November later that year. His club side QAF FC were representing Brunei for the 2006 AFC Challenge Cup and 2007 AFF Championship qualification. Previously, Mardi played for the Brunei Under-21s at the 2005 Hassanal Bolkiah Trophy.

International goals

Personal life
Mardi's twin brother Hardi Bujang is also a Bruneian footballer, making their international debuts at the same match. Mardi went on loan to DPMM FC during Hardi's stint, which means they have played together at QAF FC, DPMM FC, Jerudong FC and the national team. Having both on the field has caused trouble and confusion to referees on one occasion at least.

Mardi, a Bruneian Iban, converted to Islam in April 2009.

References

External links
 
 

1984 births
Living people
Bruneian footballers
Brunei international footballers
DPMM FC players
Converts to Islam
Association football midfielders